John Michael Steele is C.F. Koo Professor of Statistics at the Wharton School of the University of Pennsylvania, and he was previously affiliated with Stanford University, Columbia University and Princeton University.

Steele was elected the 2009 president of the Institute of Mathematical Statistics.

Awards
Source:

 Fellow, Institute for Mathematical Statistics, 1984; 
 Fellow, American Statistical Association, 1989; 
 Frank Wilcoxon Prize, American Society for Quality Control and the American Statistical Association, 1990
 Chauvenet Prize (with Vladimir Pozdnyakov), in 2020, for their paper "Buses, Bullies, and Bijections"

Books

References

External links
 J. Michael Steele's homepage
 

20th-century American mathematicians
21st-century American mathematicians
Living people
Probability theorists
Year of birth missing (living people)
Fellows of the American Statistical Association
Presidents of the Institute of Mathematical Statistics
Wharton School of the University of Pennsylvania faculty
Stanford University Department of Statistics faculty
Columbia University faculty
Princeton University faculty